Burr Oak Creek is a stream in Nodaway County in the U.S. state of Missouri. It is a tributary of Nodaway River.

Burr Oak Creek was so named on account of burr oak timber near its course.

See also
List of rivers of Missouri

References

Rivers of Nodaway County, Missouri
Rivers of Missouri